Cuauthémoc Muñoz (born 18 May 1961) is a Mexican former cyclist. He competed in the team time trial event at the 1984 Summer Olympics.

References

External links
 

1961 births
Living people
Mexican male cyclists
Olympic cyclists of Mexico
Cyclists at the 1984 Summer Olympics
Place of birth missing (living people)